Jia Yuping (born 3 May 1986) is a Chinese cross-country skier. She competed in the women's sprint at the 2006 Winter Olympics.

References

External links

1986 births
Living people
Chinese female cross-country skiers
Chinese female biathletes
Olympic cross-country skiers of China
Cross-country skiers at the 2006 Winter Olympics
Place of birth missing (living people)